Les Quatre journées is a 1916 opera by Alfred Bruneau to a libretto by Émile Zola given at the Opéra comique, Paris.

References

Operas
1916 operas
French-language operas
Operas by Alfred Bruneau
Operas set in France